is a Hong Kongese professional darts player who mainly plays at the soft-tip darts events in Asia and occasionally at the steel-tip in World Darts Federation (WDF). She is also a former Cantopop singer for Boombeat Music and show hostess.

Music career
After graduating from high school, Leung was discovered by Boombeat Music in 2004 for her talent in singing. After signing up and becoming an official singer, her manager and family advised her to complete her university degree before deciding whether to continue in her career or not. Meanwhile, her company organized her to participate in big events and MV's, mainly with other big singers in the company such as Ella Koon. During this time she recorded the songs "I Was Here" and "The Whole World Love-Lost".

In 2006, Leung decided to stop singing and focus on her education. Still participating in public events however, she won the <<CASH>> Cantopop Singer/Lyricist Award. At the end of the year, she was invited to host the show Boom Sanctuary, taking over Kay Tse due to pregnancy. Completing her degree, Leung joined the 2007 New Singer's cohort. In July, she recorded her first official debut song, "Why, Why". On 9 September, she released her first album Under the Sun.

Despite some initial popularity, Leung was dropped by her entertainment company and has since reverted to a normal life.

Darts career
She got her first contact with a darts in the youth center of church in Hong Kong. There was an unused old darts soft-tip machine. The feeling of joy resulting from the game of darts made her become more interested in this sport discipline. Leung had been active as a singer, but after achieving her dream in 2016 of representing the Hong Kong team and won a Dartslive Soft Darts World Cup, she wanted going further in darts and retired from singing for being a full-time professional darts player.

In 2017, she advanced to the steel-tip Malaysian Open final, but unfortunately lost to Mozhgan Rahmani. In the same year, she represented Hong Kong at the 2017 WDF World Cup and reached fourth round in singles competition lost 2–4 in legs to Anna Forsmark. In the remaining competitions of that World Cup edition, she did not achieve significant successes. Similarly, during the 2018 WDF Asia-Pacific Cup played a year later, did not do well, including being knocked-out in the group-stage in the singles tournament.

In 2019, she achieved her best steel-dart achievement to date, advancing to the quarter-finals of the singles tournament during the 2019 WDF World Cup. Eventually she was eliminated in the match against Tori Kewish, lost 3–5 in legs. In the same year, she repeated success from three years ago and as a member of the Hong Kong national team won the Dartslive Soft Darts World Cup title for the second time. Additionally, she was awarded by the organizers as the MVP of this tournament.

The coronavirus pandemic caused her professional career to slow down, but she is still active in sports competitions at national and continental levels.

Awards
 TVB 2005 – "DIVA Most Harmonic Piece"
 The 18th "<<CASH>> Cantopop Singer/Lyricist Award" – Award Piece: "Two Seater"
 TVB 2007 – "Beautiful Pink Lady"
 Metro Hit Radio – "New best singer 2007 – Bronze"
 Road Show ultimate singers 2007 – "Ultimate New Singer 2007"

External links
Weibo
Facebook
Instagram
Official Blog
Official Forum+Site

Notes

Cantopop singers
21st-century Hong Kong women singers
1985 births
Living people
Hong Kong darts players
Female darts players